Lorenz Leskosek (born 16 March 2000) is an Austrian footballer who plays as a defender for SV Lafnitz.

Club career
On 6 February 2019, Leskosek joined SV Lafnitz.

International career
Leskosek has played seven games for Austria U15, six for Austria U16, three for Austria U17, eight for Austria U18 and one for Austria U19.

References

2000 births
Living people
Austrian footballers
Association football defenders
2. Liga (Austria) players
Austria youth international footballers
FC Liefering players
SV Lafnitz players